Prohibitory traffic signs are used to prohibit certain types of manoeuvres or some types of traffic.

Modern prohibitory traffic signs

No entry
No admittance to unauthorised personnel, usually shown as a red circle with a white rectangle across its face. It is often used for one-way traffic.

Wrong way
These signs denote that the road is only for traffic coming in the opposite direction. Used at intersections to roads with one-way traffic or ramps.

Road closed
No admittance for vehicles. It is used on closed roads.

No straight ahead
Traffic is not permitted to continue straight, and must usually turn. These may occur at an intersection with incoming one-way traffic.

No motor vehicles
Motor vehicles are not permitted in this region.

No motorcycles
Motorcycles are not permitted in this area.

No heavy goods vehicles
Heavy goods vehicles are not allowed.

No buses
Buses are not permitted.

No pedestrians
Pedestrians are not allowed on the road, but may use a footpath instead.

No bicycles

No pedestrians or bicycles
Pedestrians and bicycles are not permitted, but may be allowed on a footpath.

No right, left, or U-turn
Either for all vehicles or with some exceptions (emergency vehicles, buses). These are usually to speed up traffic through an intersection or due to street cars or other right of ways or if the intersecting road is one-way. Indicated near-universally by an arrow making the prohibited turn overlaid with a red circle with an angular line crossing it.

No right turn signs

No left turn signs

No turn signs

No U-turn signs

No left or U-turn signs

Other turn prohibition signs

No overtaking
Either overtaking is prohibited for all vehicles or certain kinds of vehicles only (e.g. lorries, motorcycles, etc...). In the USA, this is usually phrased as "no passing zone" and indicated by a rectangular, black-on-white sign on the right side of the road that says "DO NOT PASS" and/or by a solid yellow line painted on the roadway marking the left limit of traffic (centerline), and sometimes supplemented by a yellow  (no passing zone) sign on the opposite side of the road (where it can be seen by a driver who is attempting to pass). Conversely, when the passing restriction is lifted, a rectangular, black-on-white sign that says "PASS WITH CARE" is placed on the right side of the road and/or the yellow centerline changes from solid to broken (indicating that passing is allowed in that direction).

No overtaking or passing signs

End of overtaking signs

Limits

Speed limits

Used to indicate a maximum permissible speed. Speed limits are posted in kilometres per hour in most countries, however the United Kingdom and United States continue to use miles per hour. Motorists are expected to be aware of this, as the majority of speed limit signs display only a number and no specific units, although some countries' signs do display the unit as well. In Canada, the first sign in a sequence will display km/h and subsequent signs often will omit the unit.

Speed limit signs

End of speed limit
Used to denote that a previously posted speed limit is no longer in effect. Statutory state, local, or national speed limits usually govern speed after this point, unless another limit is signposted.

Weight limits
Used denote maximum weight for bridges.

Width limits
Used to denote maximum width on narrow roadways.

Height limits
Used to denote height limit on bridges and underpasses.

Length limits
Used to denote maximum length.

No horns
Sounding vehicle horns is not allowed for vehicles in some areas, most commonly in school zones, villages, or near hospitals or churches.

No parking
One of the most familiar signs, this sign is used where parking is prohibited. Usually shown as a red diagonal bar inside a blue circle with a red ring in Europe and parts of Asia, and a 'P' in a red circle with a cross through in North and South America, elsewhere in Asia, Australia, Africa and Ireland. The no parking sign is a part of controlled parking zone sign, which is obsolete in Belgrade from 1997.

No stopping
This sign is used where parking and stopping is prohibited. Usually shown as a red cross inside a blue circle with a red ring in Europe and parts of Asia, and a 'E' in a red circle with a X through in South America.

Stop at customs
Stop at customs that are used at border crossings, toll roads or police.

End of restrictions
These are the signs that end restrictions.

Other

See also
No symbol
Warning sign

References

Traffic signs